Split Enz is a DVD by New Zealand rock band Split Enz, released in 2002 by Mushroom Records.

Track listing 

Also features an interactive discography, photo gallery and poster gallery

References

2002 video albums